Aethes grandaeva is a species of moth of the family Tortricidae. It was described by Razowski and Becker in 1983. It is found in Paraná, Brazil.

References

grandaeva
Moths described in 1983
Moths of South America
Taxa named by Józef Razowski